''OUT FRONT Magazine'' is an LGBT newspaper and daily online publication in the Denver metropolitan area. OUT FRONT was founded by Phil Price with its first issue hitting the stands on April 2, 1976. 'OUT FRONT' is the second oldest independent LGBT (Lesbian Gay Bisexual Transgender) publication in the United States

History 
After the Stonewall riots on June 28, 1969, the homosexual community began fighting back against the government-sponsored system that persecuted sexual minorities.  Despite being founded seven years later by Phil Price, a student at the University of Colorado in Boulder in 1976, OUT FRONT came on the heels of the Stonewall riots and became part of the gay rights movement.  Price saw a need for a voice for the LGBT community in Colorado and started the publication in his parents' basement.

On June 5, 1981, AIDS was first reported in the gay community in Los Angeles.  For OUT FRONT, this meant a period of time where a single issue of the publications didn't go by without a memorial for an AIDS victim.  This epidemic brought the LGBT community together, unifying their common grief and support of victims through the publication of breaking news on the search for diagnoses, treatment and a cure.

Colorado Amendment 2, also known as Romer v. Evans, served as a major uniting factor for the gay community in 1996, when the Supreme Court ruled that the law was unconstitutional.  Amendment 2  was passed in Colorado in 1992 and prevented any city, town or county in the state from taking any legislative, executive, or judicial action from recognizing homosexual citizens as a protected class.  In other words, the legislation took away the ability to put in place non-discrimination laws in the state of Colorado, giving it the "hate state" reputation.  Due to a strong activist base, the case was pushed to the Supreme Court, where it was overturned.  Justice Anthony Kennedy wrote the majority opinion, stating that:

"To the contrary, the amendment imposes a special disability upon those persons alone. Homosexuals are forbidden the safeguards that others enjoy or may seek without constraint."

In the midst of the battle of Amendment 2, Price died in 1993 at the age of 39 as a victim of AIDS.  He left Out Front to Greg Montoya, Jay Klein, and Jack Kelley.  Kelley later died due to natural causes.

The paper changed its name from OUT FRONT to Out Front Colorado at the suggestion of former advertising director David Beach and at the urging of former editor Madeline Ingraham in 1995 in hopes of reaching out on a national level. The name change proved to be highly successful. The name change of the publication also served to provide a niche for local LGBT news. During Jerry Cunningham's ownership, the title of the publication was changed back to the original OUT FRONT.

The magazine celebrated its 44th Anniversary on April 2, 2020.

The publication has had a web presence since 2006, creating a more versatile way of reaching information with some articles being only available either in print or on the website.

Content 
Price started the publication from a political perspective, being "very in-your-face and rebellious".  While the publication still publishes political information and supports candidates, news features and entertainment are the main components.

The longevity of the publication has been, in parts, thanks to its niche writing and focus on the Colorado LGBT community.  While nationwide issues are covered, the publication strives to find the local angle for their readers.

The paper has covered in-depth news stories from around the region in the past such as the arrival of the HIV/AIDS pandemic, the Colorado Amendment 2 controversy, and the murder of Matthew Shepard.

The paper also publishes several Special Edition issues each year with themes and coverage of community events such as AIDS Walk Colorado, Rocky Mountain Regional Rodeo, Aspen Gay Ski Week, Dining Out For Life, as well as an annual Holiday Gift Guide and New Year's issues. The largest issue based on circulation and page count is the Special Edition issue timed to coincide with PrideFest when that event takes place in Denver each June.

Year-round regular features in Out Front include commentary by drag comedian NuClea Waste, Gabby Gourmet restaurant reviews, an "Ask A Slut" advice column answered by a group of 8 local drag performers, and a satirical column on gay culture called Stuff Gay People Like.

Ownership 

Greg Montoya and Jay Klein owned and managed OUT FRONT from the time between Phil Price's death in 1993 until early 2012, when Colorado resident Jerry Cunningham bought the tabloid and continued its operation. On October 30, 2020, Jerry Cunningham stepped back to focus on the non-profit pursuits of the OUT FRONT Foundation, as Maggie Phillips and Addison Herron-Wheeler became majority owners and co-publishers of the magazine.

Price and Distribution 

OUT FRONT is maintained through advertisement sales and is a free publication, distributed throughout the Denver Metro area as well as other parts of Colorado. An annual mail subscription can be bought for $39.97 from the website.

It has a main circulation of 10,000 copies distributed at more than 250 locations in the Denver metropolitan area. OUT FRONT has a main readership of 50,000 readers.

External links
 OUT FRONT
 OUT FRONT Facebook

References

LGBT in Colorado
LGBT-related magazines published in the United States
Mass media in Denver
Magazines published in Colorado
Magazines established in 1976